The Hunchun–Ulanhot Expressway, designated as G12 and commonly referred to as the Hunwu Expressway is a  in the People's Republic of China that connects the cities of Hunchun, Jilin and Ulanhot, Inner Mongolia. The route parallels much of China National Highway 302.

Detailed itinerary

References

Expressways in Jilin
Expressways in Inner Mongolia
Chinese national-level expressways